The Piscina delle Rose is a sports venue located in Rome, Italy. It hosted the preliminaries for the water polo events at the 1960 Summer Olympics.

References
 1960 Summer Olympics official report. Volume 1. pp. 75–6.
 Rome.angelinfo.com profile

Venues of the 1960 Summer Olympics
Olympic water polo venues
Sports venues in Italy
Sports venues in Rome
Rome Q. XXXII Europa